Goodman is a city in McDonald County, Missouri, United States. The population was 1,248 at the 2010 census.

History
A post office called Goodman has been in operation since 1897. The community was named for L. A. Goodman, a businessperson in the local orchards industry.

Geography
Goodman is located in northern McDonald County along Missouri Route C just east of U.S. Route 71. It is approximately eight miles south of Neosho in Newton County and eight miles north of Anderson.

Demographics

2010 census
As of the census of 2010, there were 1,248 people, 450 households, and 308 families residing in the city. The racial makeup of the city was 88.0% White, 0.1% African American, 1.9% Native American, 0.5% Asian, 3.5% Pacific Islander, 2.6% from other races, and 3.4% from two or more races. Hispanic or Latino of any race were 3.9% of the population.

There were 450 households, of which 38.9% had children under the age of 18 living with them, 48.9% were married couples living together, 12.4% had a female householder with no husband present, 7.1% had a male householder with no wife present, and 31.6% were non-families. 25.3% of all households were made up of individuals, and 10.6% had someone living alone who was 65 years of age or older. The average household size was 2.75 and the average family size was 3.28.

The median age in the city was 32.2 years. 29.2% of residents were under the age of 18; 9.6% were between the ages of 18 and 24; 26% were from 25 to 44; 22% were from 45 to 64; and 13.1% were 65 years of age or older. The gender makeup of the city was 49.9% male and 50.1% female.

2000 census
As of the census of 2000, there were 1,183 people, 454 households, and 319 families residing in the town. The population density was 921.4 people per square mile (356.8/km2). There were 501 housing units at an average density of 390.2 per square mile (151.1/km2). The racial makeup of the town was 90.36% White, 0.34% African American, 3.30% Native American, 0.08% Asian, 1.35% Pacific Islander, 0.17% from other races, and 4.40% from two or more races. Hispanic or Latino of any race were 0.76% of the population.

There were 454 households, out of which 35.0% had children under the age of 18 living with them, 52.6% were married couples living together, 10.6% had a female householder with no husband present, and 29.7% were non-families. 26.2% of all households were made up of individuals, and 13.7% had someone living alone who was 65 years of age or older. The average household size was 2.57 and the average family size was 3.06.

In the town the population was spread out, with 28.2% under the age of 18, 7.8% from 18 to 24, 26.7% from 25 to 44, 22.5% from 45 to 64, and 14.8% who were 65 years of age or older. The median age was 36 years. For every 100 females, there were 102.2 males. For every 100 females age 18 and over, there were 93.0 males.

The median income for a household in the town was $26,349, and the median income for a family was $29,728. Males had a median income of $26,250 versus $21,364 for females. The per capita income for the town was $11,052. About 14.8% of families and 18.3% of the population were below the poverty line, including 18.9% of those under age 18 and 16.8% of those age 65 or over.

Notable person
Jerry Capehart - Singer, songwriter, music producer and entertainment manager.

References

Cities in McDonald County, Missouri
Cities in Missouri